"Next Best Superstar" is a song by English singer Melanie C. The track was written by Adam Argyle and produced by Greg Haver for her third solo album, Beautiful Intentions (2005). The song features thumping drums and new wave guitars and talks about the fickleness of fame resulting from manufactured genre shows such as the music competition Pop Idol.

"Next Best Superstar" was released as the album's lead single on 4 April 2005. The song peaked at number ten on the UK Singles Chart and reached the top forty of the majority of all charts it appeared on, also becoming a top ten hit in Belgium, Italy and Scotland. An accompanying music video was Norwegian director by Ray Kay.

Music video
The video was directed by Ray Kay in January 2005. The video begins with Melanie C getting ready for her performance. After having done make-up, she starts performing by herself. After the performance, she gets her make-up done again and starts performing again, this time with her band. The video premiered on CD:UK on 26 February 2005.

Track listings

 UK CD1
 "Next Best Superstar" – 3:31
 "Everything Must Change" – 3:32

 UK CD2
 "Next Best Superstar" – 3:31
 "Next Best Superstar"  – 7:06
 "Next Best Superstar"  – 5:29
 "Next Best Superstar"  – 3:01
 "Next Best Superstar" 

 UK 7-inch single
A. "Next Best Superstar" – 3:31
B. "Next Best Superstar"  – 3:04

 German CD single
 "Next Best Superstar" – 3:31
 "Next Best Superstar"  – 3:04
 "Everything Must Change" – 3:32
 "Next Best Superstar"  – 3:01
 "Next Best Superstar"  – 3:31

 Australian CD single
 "Next Best Superstar" – 3:31
 "Next Best Superstar"  – 3:04
 "Everything Must Change" – 3:32
 "Next Best Superstar"  – 7:14
 "Next Best Superstar"  – 5:29
 "Next Best Superstar"  – 3:01

Charts

Release history

References

2005 singles
2005 songs
Big Records singles
Melanie C songs
Music videos directed by Ray Kay
Songs written by Adam Argyle